The Armenian National Baseball Team is the national baseball team of Armenia. The team represents Armenia in international baseball competitions.

The team is managed by the Armenian Baseball Federation, which is a member of the Confederation of European Baseball.

See also
 Sport in Armenia

References

National baseball teams in Europe
Baseball